WKAZ can refer to:

WKAZ (AM), a radio station (680 AM) located in Charleston, West Virginia, United States
WKAZ-FM, a radio station (107.3 FM) located in Miami, West Virginia, United States